Thomasettia a genus of spiders in the family Sparassidae, with a single species, Thomasettia seychellana, first described in 1911. It has not been found since, and has been declared extinct. It was endemic to Mahe Island and Silhouette Island in the Seychelles.

References

Endemic fauna of Seychelles
Sparassidae
Extinct arachnids
Extinct invertebrates since 1500
Monotypic Araneomorphae genera
Spiders of Africa